Mount Amery is a  mountain summit located in the North Saskatchewan River valley of Banff National Park, in the Canadian Rockies of Alberta, Canada. Its nearest higher peak is Mount Saskatchewan,  to the northwest, but they are separated by the Alexandra River. Mount Amery can be seen from the Icefields Parkway north of Saskatchewan Crossing, with optimum photography conditions in the early morning light. Precipitation runoff from Mount Amery drains into tributaries of the Saskatchewan River.


History
Mount Amery honors Leo Amery (1873-1955), who was a British politician and journalist who twice visited the Canadian Rockies. Unusually, he (along with Brian Meredith and Edward Feuz Jr.) made the first ascent of the mountain in 1929, after it had been named for him in 1928.

Geology
Like other mountains in Banff Park, Mount Amery is composed of sedimentary rock laid down from the Precambrian to Jurassic periods. Formed in shallow seas, this sedimentary rock was pushed east and over the top of younger rock during the Laramide orogeny.

Climate
Based on the Köppen climate classification, Mount Amery is located in a subarctic climate zone with cold, snowy winters, and mild summers.

See also

Geography of Alberta
List of mountains of Canada

Gallery

References

External links
 Weather forecast: Mount Amery
 Parks Canada web site: Banff National Park
 Flickr: Mount Amery photo

Three-thousanders of Alberta
Mountains of Banff National Park
Canadian Rockies
Alberta's Rockies